Schanke is a surname. Notable people with the surname include:

Guri Schanke (born 1961), Norwegian actress and singer
Einar Schanke (1927–1990), Norwegian composer
Kari Schanke (1922–2006), Norwegian politician 

Norwegian-language surnames